William Rockne Tarkington, Jr. (May 14, 1932 – April 5, 2015) was an American stage, film and television actor.

Career

Born in Junction City, Kansas, Tarkington began his career as a stage actor, and made the transition to television with guest appearances in episodes of The Alfred Hitchcock Hour, Kraft Suspense Theatre, The Man from U.N.C.L.E., Ben Casey,  Mission: Impossible, Bewitched, and many others. Tarkington was also the first credited black actor to appear on The Andy Griffith Show.

Tarkington made recurring appearances on Tarzan (as Tao) and starred as Elihu Morgan on Danger Island on Hanna-Barbera's Banana Splits Adventure Hour. He also played "Too Mean" Malone on the 1983–84 season of Matt Houston and made appearances in episodes of Bearcats!, MacGyver, Baretta and other shows in the 1970s and 1980s.

As a film actor, Tarkington played the title role in the blaxploitation picture Black Samson (1974), and co-starred with Richard X. Slattery in The No Mercy Man (1973) and Zebra Force (1976). He also appeared in films such as Soldier in the Rain (1963), Clarence, the Cross-Eyed Lion (1965), The Great White Hope (1970), Beware! The Blob (1972), Melinda (1972), The Baltimore Bullet (1980), National Lampoon's Movie Madness (1983), The Ice Pirates (1984), Uphill All the Way (1986) and Death Before Dishonor (1987), and had parts in many television films.

Tarkington was the first choice to play the part of Williams in Enter the Dragon (1973), but just before the start of filming he was replaced by Jim Kelly.

Personal life
Tarkington lived in Los Angeles for the majority of his career where he was married to fellow screen actor Joan Blackman from July 1968 to October 1970. In the 1990s he returned home to Kansas when his mother became ill. He eventually became a Mormon after seeing a television commercial for the Church of Jesus Christ of Latter-day Saints.

Filmography

References

External links
 

African-American male actors
American Latter Day Saints
American male film actors
Place of death missing
American male stage actors
American male television actors
People from Junction City, Kansas
Male actors from Kansas
1931 births
2015 deaths
Converts to Mormonism
20th-century African-American people
21st-century African-American people